CCR4-NOT transcription complex subunit 2 is a protein that in humans is encoded by the CNOT2 gene. It is a subunit of the CCR4-Not deadenylase complex.

References

External links

Further reading